Zachary Wigon is an American film critic and film director.  His debut feature was The Heart Machine.

Biography 
Wigon, who has lived in New York City his entire life, attended Tisch School of the Arts.  He has contributed to Slant Magazine, Filmmaker, and The Village Voice as a film critic.  His short film Someone Else's Heart won the Hammer to Nail Short Film Contest and was the basis for his debut feature film, The Heart Machine, a romantic thriller loosely based on his own experiences.  It debuted at the 2014 SXSW.  Wigon has said that his experience as a filmmaker has informed his film criticism more than the reverse.  His followup is a romantic thriller titled Sanctuary, which finished shooting in September 2021.

In 2014, L Magazine named him #7 in their "Top 30 Under 30", and Paste named him #8 in their Top Ten Best New Filmmakers of 2014.

Filmography 
 Someone Else's Heart (2012)
 The Heart Machine (2014)
 Sanctuary (2022)

References

External links 
 

Living people
American film critics
Film directors from New York City
Tisch School of the Arts alumni
Year of birth missing (living people)